The Battle of Athani, was fought in 1690 between the Maratha Empire and the Mughal Empire during the Maratha War of Independence. The battle resulted in a victory for the Mughals and Athani was not captured.

References

Athani
Athani
History of Karnataka
Athani